Kai-Nan An is a medical researcher and academic.

Career
He is the John and Posy Krehbiel Professor Emeritus at the Mayo Clinic College of Medicine and Science.

In 2022 he was elected to the Academia Sinica.

References

Mayo Clinic people
Members of Academia Sinica
Year of birth missing (living people)
Living people
Place of birth missing (living people)